Natilus is a Californian startup company developing seaplane UAVs to ship air cargo.

Market 

Natilus targets an existing $100 billion per year Trans-Pacific airfreight market, growing due to e-commerce and as 30% of US companies sales are international.

In 2015 it planned to initially operate a fleet of up to five cargo planes with one partner per route and offering the cargo insurance for the first year, saving operational costs for freight forwarders and increasing the profit margin by 20%. Natilus hopes to build hundreds of the drones, to operate itself under its customer brands or to sell them directly to customers like UPS and FedEx or “medium freight forwarders” like Whole Foods and Costco.
It would cost about one-tenth of a crewed freight aircraft, and transoceanic trips would cost about half as much as standard air freight.

Natilus hopes to balance speed with cost, shipping time-sensitive freight that isn’t valuable enough to fly, but is more valuable than much of what sails, like perishable food, basic electronic components, vehicles, pharmaceuticals.
Bulkier and cheaper goods like crude oil or clothing would still travel slowly but cheaply by sea and high-end goods like sushi-grade fish or luxury cars would still fly faster for more money.
Freight is a $15.5 trillion market worldwide.

Aircraft 

The craft would carry  in freight containers and unit load devices.
Made of carbon fibre and fibreglass composites, its production cost is estimated at $25 million, much lower than jetliners due to fewer onboard systems and no pilots, it would be powered by jet engines developed by Pratt & Whitney.

Natilus aims to ship  from Los Angeles to Shanghai in 30h for $130,000 at $3 per gallon of jet fuel, while a Boeing 747 takes 11h for $260,000 and a cargo ship takes 504 hours for $61,000

Development 
A  wingspan scale model will test the autopilot and water take-off and landing.
In July 2015, it was targeted to fly within 18 months before a full scale aircraft three years later.

Natilus raised $750,000 of venture capital from Tim Draper and was incubated at the aviation-oriented Starburst Accelerator in Los Angeles.
The over  full-scale drone would be finished by 2020 to be flight tested and certified before commercial flights.

In August 2017, smaller  cargo-drones were envisioned, with large cargo doors and designed for a  dimensional weight.

In November 2017, Natilus closed a second round of seed funding from Starburst Ventures, Seraph Group, Gelt VC, Outpost Capital and Draper Associates.

The 2-tonne payload freighter would have a blended wing body configuration.

The next aircraft will be a blended wing body (BWB) landplane, providing 30% more volume.
The first product will be a small regional freighter powered by a Pratt & Whitney Canada PT6A with a  cargo capacity and a  MTOW, to fly in 2020 and to be certified under the FAR Part 23 within 3.5 years from February 2018.

See also

References

External links
 

Aircraft manufacturers of the United States
American companies established in 2014
2014 establishments in California
Vehicle manufacturing companies established in 2014
Aerospace companies of the United States